André Alexandre de Barros Junior (born 21 March 1996), known simply as Juninho Barros, is a Brazilian footballer who plays as a midfielder for Afogados da Ingazeira.

Career statistics

Club

Notes

References

1996 births
Living people
Sportspeople from Recife
Brazilian footballers
Association football midfielders
Santa Cruz Futebol Clube players
Clube Náutico Capibaribe players
Sport Club do Recife players
Vera Cruz Futebol Clube players
Fortaleza Esporte Clube players
Marília Atlético Clube players
SC Austria Lustenau players
Austrian Regionalliga players
Austrian Football Bundesliga players
Brazilian expatriate footballers
Brazilian expatriate sportspeople in Austria
Expatriate footballers in Austria